The San Martín Island woodrat (Neotoma bryanti martinensis) is an extinct subspecies of Bryant's woodrat in the family Cricetidae.

Description
It was endemic to San Martín Island, located off the Pacific coast of the central Baja California Peninsula, part of southwestern Baja California state in northwestern Mexico.

The primary threat to the San Martín Island woodrat was predation by feral cats on the island.

References

Musser, G. G. and M. D. Carleton. 2005. Superfamily Muroidea. pp. 894–1531 in Mammal Species of the World a Taxonomic and Geographic Reference. D. E. Wilson and D. M. Reeder eds. Johns Hopkins University Press, Baltimore.

San Martín Island woodrat
Endemic mammals of Mexico
San Martín Island woodrat
Rodents of North America
Endemic fauna of the Baja California Peninsula
San Martín Island woodrat
San Martín Island woodrat
San Martín Island woodrat
San Martín Island woodrat
Species endangered by invasive species
Taxonomy articles created by Polbot